The 2015 ICC World Cricket League Africa Region Twenty20 Division Three is a cricket tournament that took place in 2015.

Teams
Teams that will participate are as follows:

References

2016 ICC World Twenty20